James Ivory, FRS FRSE KH LLD (17 February 1765 – 21 September 1842) was a British mathematician. He was creator of Ivory's Theorem on confocal conic sections.

Life
Ivory was born in Dundee, son of James Ivory the renowned watchmaker. The family lived and worked on the High Street in Dundee.

He was educated at Dundee Grammar School. In 1779 he entered the University of St Andrews, distinguishing himself especially in mathematics. He then studied theology; but, after two sessions at St Andrews and one at Edinburgh University, he abandoned all idea of the church, and in 1786 he became an assistant-teacher of mathematics and natural philosophy in the newly established Dundee Academy. Three years later he became partner in, and manager of, a flax spinning company at Douglastown in Forfarshire, still prosecuting in moments of leisure his favourite studies. He was essentially a self-trained mathematician, and was not only deeply versed in ancient and modern geometry, but also had a full knowledge of the analytical methods and discoveries of the continental mathematicians.

His earliest memoir, dealing with an analytical expression for the rectification of the ellipse, is published in the Transactions of the Royal Society of Edinburgh (1796); and this and his later papers on Cubic Equations (1799) and Kepler's Problem (1802) evince great facility in the handling of algebraic formulae. In 1804 after the dissolution of the flax-spinning company of which he was manager, he obtained one of the mathematical chairs in the Royal Military College, Great Marlow (afterwards removed to Sandhurst); and until the year 1816, when failing health obliged him to resign, he discharged his professional duties with remarkable success.

During this period he published in the Philosophical Transactions several important memoirs, which earned for him the Copley Medal in 1814 and ensured his election as a Fellow of the Royal Society in 1815. Of special importance in the history of attractions is the first of these earlier memoirs (Phil. Trans., 1809), in which the problem of the attraction of a homogeneous ellipsoid upon an external point is reduced to the simpler case of the attraction of another but related ellipsoid upon a corresponding point interior to it. This theorem is known as Ivory's theorem. He also published anonymously an edition of Euclid's Elements, which was described as having brought the difficult problems "more within the reach of ordinary understandings." His later papers in the Philosophical Transactions treat of astronomical refractions, of planetary perturbations, of equilibrium of fluid masses, etc. For his investigations in the first named of these he received a royal medal in 1826 and again in 1839.

In 1831, on the recommendation of Lord Brougham, King William IV granted him a pension of £300 per annum, and appointed him Knight of the Royal Guelphic Order, but was not subsequently made a knight bachelor to entitle him to the prefix Sir, which often came with appointments to that order. Besides being directly connected with the chief scientific societies of his own country, the Royal Society of Edinburgh, the Royal Irish Academy, etc., he was corresponding member of the Royal Academy of Sciences both of Paris and Berlin, and of the Royal Society of Göttingen.

In 1839, the University of St. Andrews conferred on him an honorary degree as a Doctor of Laws (LLD).

He died in Hampstead in north London on 21 September 1842.

See also
Eclipse
Meridian arc
Probability
Proofs of Fermat's little theorem
Rodrigues' formula

References

External links 
 

1765 births
1842 deaths
Scottish scientists
Scottish mathematicians
Scottish astronomers
Fellows of the Royal Society
Members of the French Academy of Sciences
Recipients of the Copley Medal
People from Dundee
People educated at the High School of Dundee
Alumni of the University of St Andrews
Alumni of the University of Edinburgh
Royal Medal winners
18th-century Scottish people
19th-century Scottish people
18th-century British mathematicians
19th-century British mathematicians
18th-century Scottish scientists
19th-century Scottish scientists